This is a list of cave rescue organizations worldwide. Cave rescue is the responsibility of specific organizations founded to cover country, political region or caving area.

Asia

China 
 Mountain and Cave Rescue Team of China 
 Cave Rescue of China (CRC)
 Mountain and Cave Rescue of GuangXi
 Mountain and Cave Rescue of China（MCRC）

Malaysia 
 Malaysian Fire and Rescue Department
 STORM
 MOCSAR

Pakistan 
 Pakistan Cave Research Association

Europe

Austria 
 , Austrian Cave Rescue

Belgium 
 , Belgian Cave Rescue

Bulgaria 
 , Bulgarian Cave Rescue

France 
 , French Cave Rescue

Germany 
 , Alliance of German Cave Rescue Organizations

Hungary 
 , Cave Rescue Bakony Mountains
 , North Hungarian Cave Rescue (Bükk, Gömör-tornai Karszt)
 , Hungarian Cave Rescue

Ireland 
 Irish Cave Rescue Organisation

Italy 
 CNSAS, National Alpine Cliff and Cave Rescue Corps - Speleological Rescue

Poland 
 Specjalistyczna Grupa Ratownictwa Wysokościowego PSP 
 Górskie Ochotnicze Pogotowie Ratunkowe, Mountain Rescue 
 Tatrzańskie Ochotnicze Pogotowie Ratunkowe, Tatra Mountain Rescue
 Grupa Ratownictwa Jaskiniowego Polskiego Związku Alpinizmu, Group Cave Rescue

Switzerland 
 , Swiss Cave Rescue

Slovakia 
 , Mountain Rescue Service - Cave Rescue Department

United Kingdom 

British Cave Rescue Council (BCRC)

England 
Cave Rescue Organisation, Yorkshire
 Cornwall Search and Rescue Team, Cornwall
 Derbyshire Cave Rescue Organisation
 Devon Cave Rescue Organisation
 Mendip Cave Rescue Organisation
 Upper Wharfedale Fell Rescue Association
 Gloucestershire Cave Rescue Group
 South East Cave Rescue Organisation

Northern Ireland 
 Irish Cave Rescue Organisation

Scotland 
 Scottish Cave Rescue Organisation

Wales 
 North Wales Cave Rescue Organisation
 South & Mid Wales Cave Rescue Team

Formerly
 Gwent Cave Rescue Team, South East Wales
 West Brecon Cave Rescue Team (South-West and mid-Wales)

North America

Canada 
 British Columbia Cave Rescue, British Columbia
 Alberta Cave Rescue Organization, Alberta

United States 
 Blacksburg Cave Rescue Group, Blacksburg, Virginia
 Chattanooga/Hamilton County Cave/Cliff Rescue Unit, Chattanooga, Tennessee
 Colorado Cave Rescue Network (CCRN) Denver, Colorado
 East Tennessee Cave Rescue, Knoxville, Tennessee
 Huntsville Cave Rescue Unit, Huntsville, Alabama www.HCRU.org
 Knoxville Rescue Squad Cave/Vert Team, Knoxville, Tennessee
 New Jersey Initial Response Team, Sussex County, New Jersey
 San Bernardino County Cave & Technical Rescue Team, San Bernardino, California
 Technical Rope And Cave Emergency Response Team (TRACER), Hardin County, Kentucky

Oceania

Australia 
 Australian Speleological Federation, Australian Cave Rescue
 New South Wales Cave Rescue Squad, Sydney, Australia

New Zealand 
 CaveSAR (a specialist team of LandSAR, with support from the New Zealand Speleological Society)

References

 
cave rescue